MasterChef Junior Thailand Season 2 is a reality cooking competition. It premiered on September 22, 2019 on Channel 7, accepting applications for contestants aged 8–13 years.

Contestants

Elimination table 

 (WINNER) This cook won the competition.
 (RUNNER-UP) This cook finished in second place.
 (WIN) The cook won an individual challenge (Mystery Box Challenge or Invention Test).
 (WIN) The cook was on the winning team in the Team Challenge and directly advanced to the next round.
 (HIGH) The cook was one of the top entries in an individual challenge, but didn't win.
 (IN) The cook wasn't selected as a top or bottom entry in an individual challenge.
 (IN) The cook wasn't selected as a top or bottom entry in a team challenge.
 (IMM) The cook didn't have to compete in that round of the competition and was safe from elimination.
 (PT) The cook was on the losing team in the Team Challenge and competed in the Pressure Test.
 (NPT) The cook was on the losing team in the Team Challenge, did not compete in the Pressure Test, and advanced.
 (LOW) The cook was one of the bottom entries in an individual challenge, but wasn't the last person to advance.
 (LOW) The cook was one of the bottom entries in an individual challenge, and the last person to advance.
 (LOW) The cook was one of the bottom entries in the Team Challenge and they were the only person from their team to advance
 (LOW) The cook was eliminated but saved from elimination.
 (WDR) The cook withdrew from competition.
 (ELIM) The cook was eliminated from MasterChef.

References

MasterChef Thailand
2019 Thai television seasons